Shatt-e Badam (also Romanized as Shaţţ-e Bādām) is a village in Qatruyeh Rural District, Qatruyeh District, Neyriz County, Fars Province, Iran. At the 2006 census, its population was 123, in 32 families.

References 

Populated places in Neyriz County